Behibagh is a village located in the Kulgam district in Jammu and Kashmir, India. It is about 10 km from the city of Kulgam. The main business in the village is horticulture, especially apple orchards. There are four mosques (Masjids) in the village. There is an army camp on the Anantnag -Shopian road and a police post near PHC Behibagh. The total population of village Behibagh is 2021 consisting 1126 males and 895 females. Shah, Dar, Rather, Wagah and Sheikh are the major casts in the village. Behibagh is famous for Eid celebration.

Cities and towns in Kulgam district